The Isonzo is a river in northeast Italy,  called the Soča in Slovenia

It can refer to:

 The Isonzo Front, an Italian theatre of operations during the First World War
 Isonzo DOC, a wine-producing area in northeast Italy
 14th Infantry Division Isonzo, an Italian Army unit during the  Second World War